The 1994 Washington Huskies football team was an American football team that represented the University of Washington during the 1994 NCAA Division I-A football season.  In its second season under head coach Jim Lambright, the team compiled a 7–4 record, finished in fourth place in the Pacific-10 Conference, and outscored its opponents by a combined total of 295 to 233.

In the third game, the Huskies upset Miami at the Orange Bowl, breaking the Hurricanes' home winning streak at 58 games. Midway through the season, Washington was 5–1 and ranked ninth, but lost three of the final five games. All four losses were on the road to Pac-10 opponents. Due to earlier sanctions, the Huskies were ineligible for a bowl as they were serving the second year of a two year bowl ban.

For the second consecutive year, Napoleon Kaufman was selected as the team's most valuable player. Kaufman, Mark Bruener, David Killpatrick, and Donovan Schmidt were the team captains.

Schedule

Roster

Game summaries

at USC

Ohio State

at Miami (FL)

Washington's win in the Miami Orange Bowl snapped a 58-game home winning streak for the Hurricanes.

at Oregon

at Washington State

Source:

NFL Draft selections
The following Washington players were selected in the 1995 NFL Draft:

 This draft was seven rounds, with 249 selections

Source:

References

Washington
Washington Huskies football seasons
Washington Huskies football